Gary Bruce Wilson (1956–2021) was an American anti-pornography campaigner.

Biography 
Wilson was an author who lived in Ashland, Oregon. He was formerly an adjunct professor of biology at Southern Oregon University and also taught at vocational schools. Together with his wife, Marina Robinson, he was an instructor of karezza, and the couple shared an antipathy towards orgasms.  He became widely known from his 2012 TEDx talk entitled "The Great Porn Experiment" in which he argued exposure to pornography changes brain chemistry. The talk has been viewed over 13 million times. 

Wilson started the website YourBrainOnPorn.com with his wife which argues that pornography is an addiction the same as overeating or compulsive gambling. Four years after the site's launch, he published the book Your Brain On Porn: Internet Pornography and the Emerging Science of Addiction, on the same topic and had it translated into Arabic, Dutch, German, Hungarian, Japanese, and Russian.

Wilson argued, counter to relevant experts in the subject, that porn addiction is a public health issue, and said it led to negative effects such as depression and erectile dysfunction. Wilson's material prominently undergirds the internet fads "NoFap" and "No Nut November", with his TED-X talk often linked in relevant fora in spite of the note posted by TED at the top of the recording: “This talk contains several assertions that are not supported by academically respected studies in medicine and psychology. While some viewers might find advice provided in this talk to be helpful, please do not look to this talk for medical advice.” According to historian Brian M. Watson, Wilson "with no scientific training or background ...has made a career peddling pseudoscience."

This gist of his argument is the Coolidge effect (desensitization due to seeing many new naked bodies), but scholars have expressed doubts that it applies to humans.

Wilson died on May 20, 2021 after years of illness.

References

External links 
 YourBrainOnPorn.com Gary Wilson's website

1956 births
2021 deaths
21st-century American male writers
Anti-pornography activists